Desulfurella propionica is a thermophilic sulfur-reducing eubacterium. It is Gram-negative, rod-shaped, non-motile, with type strain n U-8T (=DSM 10410T).

References

Further reading
Sneath, Peter HA, et al. Bergey's manual of systematic bacteriology. Volume 2. Williams & Wilkins, 1986.
Boyd, E. S. "Biology of Acid-Sulfate-Chloride Springs in Yellowstone National Park, Wyoming, United States of America. Microbiology. Bozeman, MT, Montana State University." Doctor of Philosophy 200 (2007).

External links
LPSN

Type strain of Desulfurella propionica at BacDive -  the Bacterial Diversity Metadatabase

Campylobacterota
Bacteria described in 1998